Charles Edward Bentall (28 January 1922 – 10 December 1947), known as Edward Bentall, was an English professional footballer who played as a half-back in the Football League for York City, in non-League football for English Martyrs, and in wartime football for York. He died from tuberculosis at the age of 25 on 10 December 1947.

References

1922 births
People from Helmsley
1947 deaths
English footballers
Association football midfielders
York City F.C. players
English Football League players
York City F.C. wartime guest players
20th-century deaths from tuberculosis
Tuberculosis deaths in England